The BMW X3 is a compact luxury crossover SUV manufactured by BMW since 2003, based on the BMW 3 Series platform. Now in its third generation, BMW markets the car as a Sports Activity Vehicle, the company's proprietary descriptor for its X-line luxury vehicles.

The first-generation X3 was designed by BMW in conjunction with Magna Steyr of Graz, Austria—who also manufactured all X3s under contract to BMW. BMW manufactured the second-generation X3 at their Spartanburg plant in South Carolina, United States. The third generation of the BMW X3 is manufactured at BMW South Africa's Rosslyn plant, a facility that underwent a major upgrade to prepare for the X3 production, replacing the long-running 3 Series production in the plant. About 76,000 units will be manufactured there annually.

The car was the first mid-size, premium SUV on the market. In 2008, BMW started competing with the Mercedes-Benz GLK-Class (renamed GLC-Class since 2016), and numerous other SUVs in this segment. The X3 is smaller than the X5 and X6, and bigger than the X1 and the X2.

An all-electric variant is sold as the BMW iX3.



First generation (E83; 2003) 

The first-generation BMW X3, internally designated as the E83, was produced from 2003 to 2010 and based on the BMW 3 Series platform. The E83 was designed by BMW in conjunction with Magna Steyr of Graz, Austria who also manufactured all first-generation X3s under contract to BMW.

As a precursor to the X3, in 2003 BMW presented the xActivity concept vehicle at the Detroit Auto Show featuring the 3 Series platform and a fixed-profile convertible body style with reinforced longitudinal rails connect the A-pillars to the rear of the car on both sides, eliminating B- or C-pillars.

The X3 premiered in September 2003 at the Frankfurt Auto Show (Internationale Automobil-Ausstellung), sharing its rear suspension with the E46 330xi and using an automatic four-wheel drive system marketed as xDrive. All X3 models feature BMW's all-wheel drive system, with a default 40:60 torque split between the front and rear axles and the ability to direct all torque to either axle. The system used an electronically controlled multiple-plate clutch to enable infinitely adjustable, fully variable distribution of torque from front to rear with the capability of up to 100 per cent of engine torque going to either axle. BMW markets the crossover as a Sports Activity Vehicle, the company's descriptor for its X-line of vehicles.

The X3 was conceived to combine the agility of a compact model with the driving experience of the company's X5. The X3 featured an upright, high H-point seating configuration, marketed as "command seating". Styling exhibited interacting concave and convex surfacing, characteristic for the company at the time along with a reinterpreted Hofmeister kink.

BMW upgraded the model in 2005 and facelifted the model in 2007, with revised body bumpers, engine, interior trim, and suspension.

The X3 3.0i won the Canadian Car of the Year Best Sports Utility Vehicle award for 2005. The X3 was initially criticised for its harsh ride, austere interior, lack of off-road capability and high price.

U.S-spec X3 models were well-equipped, with standard equipment such as: the BMW Business A/M-F/M-CD radio (with optional dealer-activated Bluetooth functionality for wireless phones), an eight-speaker premium audio system, leatherette-trimmed seating surfaces, dual power front bucket seats, aluminium interior trim accents, keyless entry, and seventeen-inch (17") aluminium-alloy wheels. Optional equipment included a ten-speaker premium audio system with Digital Sound Processing (DSP), Sirius Satellite Radio, a dashboard-mounted color GPS navigational system that replaced the upper dashboard storage compartment and contained a modified version of BMW's "iDrive" multimedia system, eighteen-inch (and later nineteen-inch) aluminium-alloy wheels, Nevada leather-trimmed seating surfaces, heated front and rear seats, a heated steering wheel, a security system, BMW Assist, a panoramic dual-pane moonroof, Xenon front headlamps with adaptive front headlamps, and sport front bucket seats.

2003–2006 
 Bluetooth could actually be ordered straight from the factory (part of the Premium Package) and functioned without dealer intervention. (Although the BMW X3 was originally offered and promised with Bluetooth support in 2004, none of the cars that shipped from the factory actually had it installed. Few were able to get it to work with servicing from their dealer.)
 The interior was upgraded with more consistent plastic panels. Also instead of having grey carpeting which was present on all 2004 X3s, the 2005 X3 came with carpeting that matched the leather ordered (with the exception of the Terracotta interior with black carpeting).
 Slightly softer suspension.
 Front fenders are one-piece, as opposed to the two-piece found on 2004 models.
 A 2.0d engine became available in 2005 for some markets – joining the 2.5i and 3.0i engines (found stateside) as well as the 3.0d engine sold elsewhere in the world.
 An 'Open-Door' indicator was added on the 2004 models.

2006–2010 
For 2006, the U.S.-spec X3 lost its 2.5L M54 inline 6-cylinder engine for the 2.5i model. The only model available from 2006 onwards for the U.S.-spec X3 was the 3.0L M54 inline 6-cylinder engine (later, the N52 inline 6-cylinder engine) and the 3.0i model (later, 3.0Si or xDrive30i). This further increased the X3's base price.

In September 2006, the E83 received a facelift with revised headlights, grille, front bumper, tail lights, rear bumper, and interior.

For the 2007 model year, the US market X3 was powered by the N52 inline 6-cylinder engine that debuted on the 2006 E90 3 Series. Internationally, the X3 received smaller engines including the 4-cylinder petrol and diesel options. In Europe, the range started with a 2.0-litre 4-cylinder petrol, a 4cyl. turbo diesel and continues with 6-cylinder turbo & bi-turbo diesels.

U.S. market 2006 X3's were equipped with a version of the 'M' technik body kit with unpainted door sills and wheel arches. U.S. spec Sport Package 2006 X3's received the full 'M' body kit (with painted front, side and rear plastic) available internationally as a factory accessory. 2.5i was removed for sale from the U.S. and Adaptive headlamps and a panoramic sunroof were made available, as well as upgraded dashboard components and leather seating.

Since September 2008, the Edition Exclusive and Edition lifestyle were available. The M-Sport Package was replaced in March 2009 by the Sport Limited Edition.

Pre-facelift styling

Post-facelift styling

Safety

Engines

Cross Country 

The X3 Cross Country, also known as the X3 CC is an X3 prepared for rally raid competition. It features a 2.9-litre inline-6 (debore and destroked M57TU2D30 engine from 3.0 litre to 2.9-litre), twin turbocharged diesel engine.

Second generation (F25; 2010) 

The F25 is the second generation of BMW X3. The vehicle was unveiled in 2010 at the 2010 Paris Motor Show. For this generation, production moved from Magna Steyr in Austria to at BMW's United States plant in Greer, South Carolina. Production started on 1 September 2010, and ended in August 2017.

Dimensions-wise, the F25-based X3 is almost as large as the original E53 series X5. At launch, all models use all-wheel drive, badged as xDrive. Transmission choices are a six-speed manual or eight-speed ZF 8HP automatic transmission. The emission standard for all engines was Euro 5. A rear-wheel drive only model called sDrive was added to the range in some markets in 2012.

M Performance Parts were released in the facelift and can be installed to all models. These include carbon fibre mirrors, a sport steering wheel, M rims, black kidney grilles and Aluminium pedals. 30d models also get a power boost kit making 27 hp more (286 hp) and 18d and 20d models can be fitted with a dual exhaust.

Europe

UK models went on sale on 18 November 2010. Early UK models included the xDrive20d. xDrive30d was added in April 2011. xDrive35d was added from September 2011. sDrive18d was added on 20 August 2012. From Spring 2013, the latest generation of BMW Professional Navigation System became available.

North America

US models arrived in US BMW Centers by the end of 2010 as 2011 model year vehicles. Early US models included xDrive28i, xDrive35i. In 2013 model year (produced in April 2012 and delivered in May 2012), a turbo four cylinder xDrive28i was introduced as replacement for the inline six xDrive28i, with new features such as standard Auto Start/Stop, Driving Dynamics Control with ECO PRO, New Driver Assistance Package (includes Lane Departure Warning). All US market vehicles come with an 8-speed automatic transmission.

For 2011, the F25 X3 is available in the US, only with a 3.0-liter inline six-cylinder gasoline engine either normally aspirated or with a twin-scroll turbocharger.

In 2012, the F25 X3 xDrive28i model's 3.0L naturally-aspired inline six-cylinder gasoline engine was replaced by the 2.0L TwinPower twin-scroll, single-turbo inline four-cylinder gasoline engine that was first introduced on the BMW 3 Series (F30), the BMW N20, more specifically coded N20B20O0. A rear-wheel-drive sDrive28i model joined the X3 model line-up, marking the first non-xDrive BMW SAV to ever be sold in the United States.

In 2013, the F25 X3 xDrive28d model joined the X3 line-up, powered by a 2.0L turbocharged inline four-cylinder diesel engine, again first introduced on the BMW 3 Series (F30). As of 2017, the xDrive28d model of the F25 X3 is no longer available for sale in the United States.

2014 update 
In 2014 for the 2015 model year, the F25 received an LCI (Life Cycle Impulse) facelift. Changes include new modified twin circular headlights (optional LED headlights), redesigned kidney grille, new front, and rear bumpers, and exterior mirrors with integrated turn signal indicators; a centre console with the optional automatic climate control system in high-gloss black-panel look, new cup holders with a sliding cover for the centre console, new exterior colours, upholstery designs, interior trim strips, and light-alloy wheels; new xLine equipment package, optional Smart Opener for the automatic tailgate and storage packages.

The vehicle was unveiled in 84th Geneva International Motor Show 2014, followed by 114th New York International Auto Show 2014 (xDrive28d).

Emission violations reported
BMW X3 20d diesel was reported to exceed EU Limit Euro 6 by over 11 times. On 24 September 2015, BMW denied this report in a statement.

Pre-facelift styling

Post-facelift styling

Engines 

* United States only. The xDrive28d used the four-cylinder engine from the European-specification xDrive20d models. Vehicles with Diesel engine sold in the United States were since end of 2008 equipped with selective catalysator using Diesel exhaust fluid (DEF) to reduce NOx emissions, while vehicles sold in Europe had a bypass exhaust pipe only.

Third generation (G01; 2017) 

The third generation is codenamed G01 and was unveiled in June 2017. Drivetrains include two 2.0-litre diesel units known as B47, a next-generation 3.0-litre diesel engine (B57), and a petrol variant (B58): a gasoline-powered, turbo-charged straight-six with a displacement of 2,998 cc and a plug-in hybrid.

It was designed by Calvin Luk, BMW's Australian designer.

Technology is shared with the BMW 5 Series (G30), such as gesture control (optional), LED exterior and interior lighting, and the BMW iDrive 6.0 system with a 12.5-inch touch-screen monitor for navigation systems. Depending on the model, the new X3 is as much as  lighter than a comparably equipped corresponding model from the previous X3 generation.

In July 2018, BMW introduced the ability to option the X3 with the sDrive intelligent rear-wheel drive system.

In the same year, BMW introduced the X3 M and X3 M Competition (F97) and the X4 M and X4 M Competition (F98), with the former being the first time an X3 had a full M version while the latter being the first time an X4 had a M version, the X3 M and X4 M are fitted with a 3.0 L S58 straight-six that produced 473 horsepower with the Competition models producing 503 horsepower.

All 18–40 and iX3 models can be fitted with M Performance Parts. These include carbon fibre mirrors.

Full M models can be fitted with full M specific M Performance Parts. These include a spoiler, sport steering wheel, carbon fibre vents and kidney grilles.

Engines 

* 30e has a power output of  when Electric Boost is engaged.

2021 facelift 

In 2021, the X3 got a facelift, adding redone grilles, minor headlights changes, refurbished interiors, and completely redone taillights.

Alpina XD3 

The Alpina XD3 made its debut at the 2018 Geneva Motor Show. The XD3 is fitted with an Alpina-modified version of BMW's B57 diesel inline-six engine.

BMW iX3 (G08; 2020) 

The iX3 is a battery electric version of the X3. Debuted in April 2018 as a concept model, production began in September 2020 at BMW's factory in Dadong, China and was released to customers in 2021.

Production and sales 
On 18 June 2008, the 500,000th X3 was produced in Graz.

References

External links 

 

X3
All-wheel-drive vehicles
Luxury crossover sport utility vehicles
Crossover sport utility vehicles
Luxury sport utility vehicles
Compact sport utility vehicles
Euro NCAP small off-road
Cars introduced in 2003
2010s cars